The Illustrated Treatise on the Maritime Kingdoms, or Haiguo Tuzhi, is a 19th-century Chinese gazetteer compiled by scholar-official Wei Yuan and others, based on initial translations ordered by Special Imperial Commissioner Lin Zexu. The Treatise is regarded as the first significant Chinese work on the West and one of China's initial responses to the Anglo-Chinese First Opium War (18391842). Eventually stretching to one hundred juan, or scrolls, the treatise contains numerous maps and much geographical detail covering both the western and eastern hemispheres. Wei's book also garnered significant interest in Japan and helped mould the country's foreign policy with respect to the West.

Background 
During his term in Canton (now Guangzhou) as Special Imperial Commissioner, Lin Zexu observed the might of British naval power and the inadequacies of the Chinese coastal defence system at first hand. Along with other intellectuals of the time, Lin's objective was "to determine the source and nature of Western power in Asia and to discover Western objectives in East Asia." The commissioner hired four Chinese translators who had been trained by missionaries to assist with the task of obtaining and translating appropriate western texts. One of them, Liang Jinde, an assistant to missionary Elijah Coleman Bridgman, provided copies of The Chinese Repository and other works. Lin also purchased a copy of the 1834 Encyclopedia of Geography by Hugh Murray from the American Board of Commissioners for Foreign Missions, which Liang  translated to become the draft for Lin's own Geography of the Four Continents. However, before the book could be published, the First Opium War broke out in 1839 and the project was shelved. When the war ended in 1842, Lin's exile to the remote northwestern city of Yili meant that he passed his draft manuscript to Wei Yuan with a request that he complete it. Lin's contributions to the treatise proved so important that Karl Gützlaff mistakenly attributed the work to him in his September 1847 review for the Chinese Repository.

Content 

As well as mapping various countries, Wei's objective was to provide as complete a picture as possible of the advantages they possessed in shipbuilding techniques and weapons production so that these "might be turned to use for subduing them." Wei completed his investigations of western penetration into East Asia in 1841, and in the Treatise proposed the construction of a shipyard and arsenal at Canton and the employment of foreign engineers to teach marine navigation and weapons operation "pioneer ideas in the military history of modern China".

Structure and editions 

The first edition of the Illustrated Treatise on the Maritime Kingdoms, comprising 50 juan or scrolls, was published on January3 1843. This was followed in 1847 with a reorganised and slightly longer version running to 60 juan, while the third and final edition of 100 juan appeared in 1852. As the editions progressed, each in turn featured new maps and geographical information regarding the West, using material that became available after the First Opium War.

Impact 

Although on publication the Treatise received scant attention in China, in the longer term, Wei and his contemporaries helped change the Chinese view of the outside world not only through the dissemination of new material but also by starting to change the view that China was the "center of civilization" or "center of the world" ("Middle Kingdom").

Wei's work was also to have a later impact on Japanese foreign policy. In 1862, samurai Takasugi Shinsaku, from the ruling Japanese Tokugawa shogunate, visited Shanghai on board the trade ship Senzaimaru. Japan had been forced open by US Commodore Matthew C. Perry less than a decade earlier and the purpose of the mission was to establish how China had fared following the country's defeat in the Second Opium War (18561860). Takasugi was aware of the forward thinking exhibited by those such as Wei on the new threats posed by Western "barbarians" and later recorded in his diary: "The philosophy of the Chinese people stands poles apart from the correct path for China's future development. They are infatuated with lofty words unrelated to reality." Sinologist Joshua Fogel concludes that when Takasugi found out "that the writings of Wei Yuan were out of print in China and that the Chinese were not forcefully preparing to drive the foreigners out of their country, rather than derive from this a long analysis of the failures of the Chinese people, he extracted lessons for the future of Japan". Similarly, after reading the Treatise, scholar and political reformer Yokoi Shōnan became convinced that Japan should embark on a "cautious, gradual and realistic opening of its borders to the Western world" and thereby avoid the mistake China had made in engaging in the First Opium War. Takasugi would later emerge as a leader of the 1868 Meiji Restoration which presaged the emergence of Japan as a modernised nation at the beginning of the 20th century. Yoshida Shōin, influential Japanese intellectual and Meiji reformer, said Wei's Treatise had "made a big impact in our country".

Notes

References

Citations

Sources

External links 
 Chinese.

Qing dynasty literature
Gazetteers
1843 books
Treatises